In calculus, the inverse function rule is a formula that expresses the derivative of the inverse of a bijective and differentiable function  in terms of the derivative of .

.

The same formula is also equivalent to the expression

where  denotes the unary derivative operator (on the space of functions) and  denotes function composition.

Geometrically, a function and inverse function have graphs that are reflections, in the line . This reflection operation turns the gradient of any line into its reciprocal.

The inverse function rule may also be expressed in Leibniz's notation. As that notation suggests,

Derivation 
Since  is an invertible function, we know that . The inverse function rule can be obtained by taking the derivative of this equation.

The right side is equal to 1 and the chain rule can be applied to the left side:

Rearranging then gives

Examples

  (for positive ) has inverse .

At , however, there is a problem: the graph of the square root function becomes vertical, corresponding to a horizontal tangent for the square function.

  (for real ) has inverse  (for positive )

Additional properties

 Integrating this relationship gives

This is only useful if the integral exists. In particular we need  to be non-zero across the range of integration.

It follows that a function that has a continuous derivative has an inverse in a neighbourhood of every point where the derivative is non-zero. This need not be true if the derivative is not continuous.

 Another very interesting and useful property is the following:

 The inverse of the derivative of f(x) is also of interest, as it is used in showing the convexity of the Legendre transform. 
Let    then we have, assuming :This can be shown using the previous notation . Then we have:

Therefore:

Higher derivatives

One can continue the same process for higher derivatives.

that is simplified further by the chain rule as

Replacing the first derivative, using the identity obtained earlier, we get

Similarly for the third derivative:

or using the formula for the second derivative,

These formulas are generalized by the Faà di Bruno's formula.

These formulas can also be written using Lagrange's notation.

Example

  has the inverse . Using the formula for the second derivative of the inverse function,

so that

,

which agrees with the direct calculation.

See also

References

 

Articles containing proofs
Differentiation rules
Inverse functions
Theorems in analysis
Theorems in calculus